Kvačany may refer to several villages in Slovakia:

Kvačany, Liptovský Mikuláš District 
Kvačany, Prešov District